Santiago Resino (born 21 April 1995) is an Argentine rugby union player, currently playing for Súper Liga Americana de Rugby side Olímpia Lions. His preferred position is centre.

Professional career
Resino signed for Súper Liga Americana de Rugby side Olímpia Lions ahead of the 2020 Súper Liga Americana de Rugby season, before re-signing ahead of the 2021 Súper Liga Americana de Rugby season to play for Cafeteros Pro. He had previously represented Argentina Sevens at two tournaments in 2015.

References

External links
itsrugby.co.uk Profile

1995 births
Living people
Argentine rugby union players
Rugby union centres
Yacare XV players